Bob Breen is an author and professional martial artist who began martial arts training in 1966. He has trained under a significant number of senior martial arts experts and respected figures in the martial arts world. He has published 10 books since 1988.

Career 

Having begun martial arts training in 1966 after what he described was an early life involving frequent fights brought about by circumstances rather than intent, Bob began studying Wado Ryu under Tatsuo Suzuki in the early part of 1967. He earned his black belt in Wado Karate in 1970. He then went on to pass his second degree in 1972. Bob continued to study Karate and associated arts, and moved to Japan in 1974 in order to train under a number of Senior Masters.
He competed for Great Britain in traditional Karate, captaining the Amateur Martial Arts Association (AMA) team who beat the Japanese in 1974, before discovering Jeet Kune Do and bringing it to Britain. Soon after Bob began boxing and groundwork, he became one of the pioneers of full contact in Europe; fighting and promoting. In 1978 he started Eskrima with Jay Dobrin. Since 1979 he has been studying Jeet Kune Do under master and worldwide respected figure Dan Inosanto, who himself trained under Bruce Lee, father of Jeet Kune Do. He is one of the foremost experts in knife-defense and close quarter combat, and was the team captain and a competitor at the 1989 World Stickfighting championships and Coach of the British Eskrima team that won 13 World Championship medals, including four gold medals in 1992.

He is now qualified as a Full Instructor in JKD and Kali.
Regarded as the father of JKD/Kali and Filipino martial arts in the UK and Europe, he has released a range of self-defense books and DVDs and currently runs a martial arts academy in Hoxton, London.

Bob Breen has also worked in training film actors in martial arts and fighting techniques, including working on spear and sword fighting with Gerard Butler and other actors for the 2007 film 300.
Bob has worked on numerous other films, including recently training Robert Patterson in fighting techniques for the movie Batman 2022.

Publications 
 Fighting 
 Sparring

See also

Dan Inosanto 
Jeet kune do
Eskrima
Bruce Lee

Notes 

British Jeet Kune Do practitioners
British male karateka
Living people
Year of birth missing (living people)
Wadō-ryū practitioners